The South Island is a New Zealand men's domestic rugby union team composed of the best of the South Island's players. They have a rivalry with the North Island, having played them in the North vs South rugby union match between 1897 and 2012, when they lost 32–34. This was to be resumed on 29 August 2020 at Eden Park, however this was delayed a week to 5 September at Sky Stadium due to the ongoing COVID-19 pandemic. The South Island beat the North Island 38–35.

References

New Zealand rugby union teams
1897 establishments in New Zealand